An amulet is an object intended to bring good luck.

Amulet may also refer to:

Arts and media

Music
Amulet (band), a Norwegian hardcore band
Amulet (Amulet album), their first album
Amulet (Fursaxa album), released in 2005
"Amulet" (song), a song by Natacha Atlas from her album Harim
"Amulet", a song by Paul Simon from his album So Beautiful or So What
Amulet Records, an American percussion and experimental music label
The Amulet (album), a 2017 album by American rock band Circa Survive

Other media
Amulet (film), a 2020 film directed by Romola Garai
Amulet (novel), a 1999 novel by Roberto Bolaño
Amulet Books, an imprint of Abrams Books
Amulet (comics), a graphic novel series by Kazu Kibuishi
 The Amulet (novel), a 1979 horror novel by Michael McDowell
The Story of the Amulet, a children's story by E. Nesbit

Other uses
AMULET microprocessor
Amulet, Saskatchewan, a hamlet